A ceramics museum is a museum wholly or largely devoted to ceramics, usually ceramic art. Its collections may also include glass and enamel, but typically concentrate on pottery, including porcelain. Most national collections are in a more general museum covering all of the arts, or just the decorative arts. However, there are a number of specialized ceramics museums, with some focusing on the ceramics of just one country, region or manufacturer. Others have international collections, which may be centered on ceramics from Europe or East Asia or have a more global emphasis.

Outstanding major ceramics collections in general museums include The Palace Museum, Beijing, with 340,000 pieces, and the National Palace Museum in Taipei city, Taiwan (25,000 pieces); both are mostly derived from the Chinese Imperial collection, and are almost entirely of pieces from China. In London, the Victoria and Albert Museum (over 75,000 pieces, mostly after 1400 CE) and British Museum (mostly before 1400 CE) have very strong international collections. The Metropolitan Museum of Art in New York and Freer Gallery of Art in Washington DC (12,000, all East Asian) have perhaps the best of the many fine collections in the large city museums of the United States. The Corning Museum of Glass, in Corning, New York, has more than 45,000 glass objects.

Many of the historic ceramics manufacturers have museums at or very near their factories, sometimes owned by the company, sometimes independent institutions.  These usually mainly or entirely contain their own wares.  Some of these are large and significant.  Among the more important ones, with large collections, covered in the articles on the concern, are: Meissen porcelain, Nymphenburg Porcelain Manufactory, Doccia porcelain, Royal Worcester, Wedgwood (now independent), Royal Crown Derby and Herend Porcelain.

Specialist museums

Some specialist ceramics museums are (number of pieces are approximate):

Australia
National Museum of Australian Pottery, Holbrook, New South Wales – Australian domestic pottery, 1500 pieces

Belgium
Musée de la Céramique, Andenne, Wallonia – tells you all about the famous ceramic from the city of Andenne

Brazil
Museu A CASA, São Paulo, São Paulo.
Oficina de Cerâmica Francisco Brennand, Recife, Pernambuco. 2000 pieces
Museu Udo Knoff de Azulejaria e Cerâmica, Salvador, Bahia. 1200 pieces

Canada
Gardiner Museum, Toronto, with 3,000 pieces.
Medalta in the Historic Clay District, Medicine Hat, Alberta, 53,000.

China
FLICAM, near Xi'an is a museum for international contemporary ceramics
Liuwan Museum of Ancient Painted Pottery, 38,000 Chinese archaeological finds
Mumingtang Ancient Porcelain Museum, Beijing
Sihai Teapot Museum, a museum dedicated to teapots in Shanghai. Founded by Xu Sihai in 1992, the Sihai Teapot Museum is also the first private museum established in modern Shanghai.
The Terracotta Army are on display where they were discovered near Xi'an
Yixing Ceramics Museum, 30,000 pieces, mainly from the Yixing area.

Czech Republic
Museum of Czech Porcelain, Prague

Denmark
 CLAY Keramikmuseum Danmark, Grimmerhus, Kongebrovej 42, DK-5500 Middelfart. Website: CLAY Keramikmuseum Danmark, Kongebrovej 42, 5500 Middelfart.

France
Sèvres - Cité de la céramique, 50,000 pieces, 5,000 of Sèvres porcelain and contemporary ceramics
Musee de la Ceramique, Rouen, 5,000 pieces, 900 displayed, mostly local faience.
Musée nationale de la porcelaine Adrien Dubouché, Limoges, 15,000 pieces, mostly Limoges porcelain also rare pieces by Böttger
The extensive archaeological excavations at La Graufesenque, one of the major production centres of Ancient Roman pottery, are open to the public with a museum on the potteries.
 Musée Départemental de la Céramique, Lezoux.
 Musée de la Céramique de Desvres, Desvres.

Germany
Waechtersbach ceramics in Brachttal, Hesse
Zwinger Museum - the Porzellansammlung, or Porcelain Collection, at the Zwinger Museum in Dresden
Hetjens-Museum or Deutsches Keramik-Museum in Düsseldorf, 15,000 pieces
Terra-Sigillata-Museum Rheinzabern, Rheinzabern, for Ancient Roman terra sigillata ware made near the town

Iran
The Glassware and Ceramic Museum of Iran, Tehran

Italy
Museo della Ceramica, in the Picture Gallery, Savona,
Museo delle porcellane, in the Boboli Gardens, Florence
International Museum of Ceramics, in Faenza,
 Antiquarium Turritano
Montelupo Museum of Tuscan Ceramics, Montelupo Fiorentino

Japan
claims to have over 500 ceramics museums, public and private, including ones at Ibaraki, Bizen, Kyoto, Arita (Kyushu Ceramic Museum), and Tokyo.  The Arita Porcelain Park is perhaps the world's only theme park based on ceramics.
NGK Museum, specializing in porcelain insulators

South Korea
Gyeonggi Ceramic Museum, Gwanggju
Icheon World Ceramic Center,

The Netherlands
Princessehof Ceramics Museum, Leeuwarden,

Portugal
Museu de Cerâmica, Caldas da Rainha, Portuguese and other ceramics,
Museu de Cerâmica de Sacavém, Sacavém

Russia
State Ceramics Museum, Kuskovo Palace, Moscow, 30,000 pieces, Russian, French and other ceramics from the Sheremetev collection,
The Hermitage, Saint Petersburg - includes the Museum of The Imperial Porcelain Factory and the famous Frog service made by Josiah Wedgwood for Catherine the Great.
Pottery Museum, Skopin, Ryazan Oblast, Skopin pottery

Spain.
Museu de Ceràmica, in the Museu de les Arts Aplicades, Barcelona.
Museo Nacional de Cerámica y de las Artes Suntuarias González Martí, Valencia, with over 5,000 pieces, mostly produced in the region.

Switzerland

 Musée Ariana: Swiss Museum for Ceramics and Glass, Geneva

Sweden
Gustavsberg Porcelain Museum (Gustavsberg, Stockholm), the history of the Gustavsberg Porcelain Factory 

Taiwan
Taipei County Yingge Ceramics Museum

Thailand
Southeast Asian Ceramics Museum, Bangkok, opened 2005, 2,000 pieces of the pottery of Thailand and neighbouring countries.

Ukraine
Pottery Museum, Vinnytsia Oblast
Folk Pottery Museum, Opyshnia, Poltava Oblast

United Kingdom
Aberystwyth University Ceramics Collection
Coalport China Museum, mainly Coalport China
Gladstone Pottery Museum - working pottery museum
Jackfield Tile Museum
Museum of Royal Worcester, at the old Royal Worcester factory site.
Percival David Foundation of Chinese Art, Bloomsbury, London. 1,400 pieces of classic Chinese porcelain from the 10th to 18th centuries.
Potteries Museum & Art Gallery, mainly Staffordshire pottery
Spode Museum, for Spode
Wedgwood Museum

United States
American Museum of Ceramic Art (Pomona, California), 7,000 pieces  
 Museum of Ceramics (East Liverpool, Ohio), 4,000 mainly Ohio pottery
Schein-Joseph International Museum of Ceramic Art, Alfred, New York, 8,000 pieces, including glass.

See also
List of museums with major collections of Asian art
List of museums with major collections of Islamic art
List of museums with major collections of Greek and Roman antiquities

Notes

References
 Peterson, Jan. The craft and art of clay: a complete potter's handbook, Laurence King Publishing, 2003, Google books Listing of museum ceramics collections (heavily weighted to US) pp. 396–412.

Further reading
 An Artist's Travel Guide to the Ceramics Museums of Europe: With Line Drawings Reproduced from the Author's Sketchbooks, Alexandra Copeland,  Artists Travel Guides, 1999,  - covers over 120 museums in 19 countries

External links
 International Ceramics Directory –comprehensive list of ceramics collections with links

 
Museum
Pottery
Porcelain
Types of museums
Lists of art museums and galleries
Lists of museums by subject
Types of art museums and galleries